Ceratosuchops (meaning "horned crocodile face") is a genus of spinosaurid from the Early Cretaceous (Barremian) of Britain.

Discovery and naming 
 
In 2021, the type species C. inferodios was named and described by a team of paleontologists including Chris Barker, Darren Naish, David Hone and others. The specific name means "hell heron", in reference to the ecology presumed by the research team.

The holotype remains of this taxon consist of IWCMS 2014.95.5 (premaxillary bodies), IWCMS 2021.30 (a posterior premaxilla fragment) and IWCMS 2014.95.1-3 (a nearly complete braincase), all of which were recovered from rocks in Chilton Chine of the Wessex Formation and stored at Dinosaur Isle museum. Referred remains include a single right postorbital (IWCMS 2014.95.4).

Phylogeny 
The authors recovered Ceratosuchops as a member of the newly erected clade, Ceratosuchopsini, closely related to Suchomimus and the coeval Riparovenator.

Paleoenvironment 

Ceratosuchops lived in a dry mediterranean habitat in the Wessex Formation, where rivers were home to riparian zones. Like most spinosaurs, it would have fed on available small to medium-sized aquatic and terrestrial prey in these areas.

References

Spinosaurids
Monotypic dinosaur genera
Barremian life
Early Cretaceous dinosaurs of Europe
Cretaceous England
Fossils of England
Fossil taxa described in 2021

Taxa named by Darren Naish